Bernhards Bay is a hamlet in Oswego County, New York, United States. Bernhards Bay has a post office with ZIP code 13028.

References

Hamlets in Oswego County, New York
Hamlets in New York (state)